Sudhanpur is a village in Maheswaram mandal, Ranga Reddy district, in the Indian state of Telangana.

Villages in Ranga Reddy district